Asiadodis is a genus of praying mantises native to Asia and possessing common names such as shield mantis, hood mantis (or hooded mantis), and leaf mantis (or leafy mantis) because of their extended, leaf-like thoraxes.  

The following species are recognised in the genus Asiadodis:
Asiadodis squilla (Asian shield mantis)
Asiadodis yunnanensis (Chinese shield mantis)

See also
List of mantis genera and species
Leaf mantis
Shield mantis

References

 
Mantodea of Asia
Mantidae